The 70th Pennsylvania House of Representatives District is located in southeast Pennsylvania and has been represented by Matthew Bradford since 2009.

District profile
The 70th District is located in Montgomery County and includes the following areas:

 East Norriton Township
Perkiomen Township
Schwenksville
Skippack Township
West Norriton Township (part)
District 01
District 02
District 04
Whitpain Township (part)
District 08
District 09
District 10
District 11
 Worcester Township

Representatives

References

Government of Montgomery County, Pennsylvania
70